The 2013–14 Florida Gators women's basketball team represented the University of Florida in the sport of basketball during the 2013–14 women's college basketball season.  The Gators competed in Division I of the National Collegiate Athletic Association (NCAA) and the Southeastern Conference (SEC).  They were led by head coach Amanda Butler, and played their home games in the O'Connell Center on the university's Gainesville, Florida campus.

In the postseason, the Gators advanced to the Quarterfinal round of the SEC tournament, where they were defeated by the Kentucky Wildcats 70–75, their only loss to Kentucky of the season.  The Gators were then selected to compete in the NCAA tournament, and advanced to the second round after defeating the Dayton Flyers 83–69.  In the second round, the Gators were ousted by the Penn State Lady Lions 61–83.

Previous season
In the 2012–13 season, the Gators finished with a record of 22–15 overall, 6–10 in the SEC, and lost in the Semifinal round of the WNIT to Drexel.

Roster

Coaches

Schedule and results

|-
!colspan=12| Regular season (Non-conference play)

|-
!colspan=12| Regular season (Conference play)

|-
!colspan=12| SEC tournament

|-
!colspan=12| NCAA tournament

|-
| colspan="12" | *Non-Conference Game. Rankings from AP poll. All times are in Eastern Time.  Tournament seedings in parenthesis.  
|}

Source:

Rankings

References

Florida Gators women's basketball seasons
Florida
Florida
Florida Gators
Florida Gators